Clovers, Trifolium species, are used as food plants by the caterpillars of a number of Lepidoptera (butterflies and moths), including:

Monophagous
Species which feed exclusively on Trifolium

 Coleophoridae
 Several Coleophora case-bearer species:
 C. argentifimbriata
 C. deauratella – only on red clover (T. pratense)
 C. mayrella – only on white clover (T. repens)
 C. spissicornis

Polyphagous
Species which feed on Trifolium and other plants

 Coleophoridae
 Several Coleophora case-bearer species:
 C. alcyonipennella
 C. frischella – recorded on white clover (T. repens)
 Crambidae
 Dolicharthria punctalis
 Gelechiidae
 Chionodes lugubrella – recorded on white clover (T. repens)
 Geometridae
 Ectropis crepuscularia (engrailed)
 Eupithecia centaureata (lime-speck pug)
 Eupithecia pusillata (juniper pug) – Americas only
 Odontopera bidentata (scalloped hazel)
 Semiothisa clathrata (latticed heath)
 Hepialidae
 Wiseana cervinata
 Hesperiidae
 Pyrgus malvae (grizzled skipper) – recorded on red clover (T. pratense)
 Lymantriidae
 Euproctis chrysorrhoea (brown-tail)
 Noctuidae
 Agrotis clavis (heart and club)
 Agrotis segetum (turnip moth)
 Axylia putris (flame)
 Discestra trifolii (nutmeg)
 Euxoa nigricans (garden dart)
 Ochropleura plecta (flame shoulder)
 Schinia jaguarina (jaguar flower moth)
 Xestia c-nigrum (setaceous Hebrew character)
 Zygaenidae
 Zygaena filipendulae (six-spot burnet)

External links 

Clover
+Lepidoptera